The Grand Prix Cristal Energie is a road bicycle race held annually in France. It was organized as a 1.2 event on the UCI Europe Tour from 2006 to 2009.

Winners

References

UCI Europe Tour races
Cycle races in France
1984 establishments in France
2015 disestablishments in France
Recurring sporting events established in 1984
Recurring sporting events disestablished in 2015
Defunct cycling races in France